Eliasz Kuziemski (30 July 1922 – 1 June 2000) was a Polish actor. He appeared in more than 50 films and television shows between 1956 and 1989.

Selected filmography
 Katastrofa (1965)
 Stawka większa niż życie (1967)

References

External links

1922 births
2000 deaths
Polish male film actors